The City Museum is a museum located in St. Louis, Missouri.

City Museum may also refer to:

City Museum, Gorkhatri, Peshawar, Pakistan
City Museum, Hyderabad, India
City Museum of Ljubljana, Slovenia
City Museum (Quito), Ecuador 
Local museums which covers history of a city.